Delhi Dreams is a tennis team representing the city of Delhi in Champions Tennis League.

The players representing this team are Juan Carlos Ferrero, Kevin Anderson, Jelena Jankovic, Sanam Singh, Karman Kaur Thandi and Garvit Batra.

References

Tennis teams in India
Sports teams in India
Sports clubs in Delhi
2014 establishments in Delhi
Sports clubs established in 2014